This is a list of ports and harbours of the Atlantic Ocean, excluding the ports of the Baltic Sea.

For inland ports on rivers, canals, and lakes, including the Great Lakes, Saint Lawrence Seaway, and Mississippi River, see inland port.

Country names follow ISO 3166 (which lists most dependent territories separately).


Table

See also

 Channel Ports (English Channel)
 List of coastal settlements of the Mediterranean Sea
 Ports of the Baltic Sea
 List of North Sea ports

Notes

 North America Port Container Traffic 2006 Port Ranking by TEUs.
 Canadian rankings from Transport Canada.
 World rankings from American Association of Port Authorities.
 U.S. rankings from American Association of Port Authorities.
 Local ports are included.
 Seasonal ports are included.
 Cruise ship ports are included.
 Fishing ports are included.
 Drydocks are noted.
 Some ports are part of the Dubai Ports World controversy.

References

 
Atlantic
Ports and harbours